Tom Harris (born 1 January 1940) is a former Australian politician. He was the Country Liberal Party member for Port Darwin in the Northern Territory Legislative Assembly from 1977 to 1990.

|}

He was a minister in the Everingham, Tuxworth, Hatton and Perron governments, serving as Minister for Education (1983–1986), Minister for Health and Minister for Housing (1986–1987), Minister for Labour and Administrative Services (1987), Minister for Education and  Minister Assisting the Chief Minister on Constitutional Development (1988–1989) and Minister for Education, the Arts and Cultural Affairs (1989–1990).

References

1940 births
Living people
Members of the Northern Territory Legislative Assembly
Country Liberal Party members of the Northern Territory Legislative Assembly